Helmut Zapf (born 4 March 1956) is a German composer.

Life 
During this time Zapf took part in the Summer Courses for Neue Musik in Gera (Thuringia). 

After graduating, he worked as Kantor at the city church in Eisenberg (Thuringia) from 1979 to 1982. Until the beginning of his  with Georg Katzer at the Akademie der Künste der DDR in Berlin (1982–1986), he wrote his first self-taught compositions, among others Singender Mann for solo flute, Brechungen I und II for flute and string trio, Klangetüde II for orchestra, Recitativ for oboe and string quartet.

He has been a member of the Academy of Arts, Berlin since 2015.

Work 
Source:

Orchestral
 1985/86: Wechselnd
 1986: Concertino
 1988: Venezianische Erinnerungen
 1989: Piece
 1992: Dreiklang III
 1992: Dreiklang V
 2008: Und wenn die Welt voll Teufel wär
 2009: Aufwind
 2010: Lasst uns Hütten bauen
 2015: Klangbäume
 2016: Eomeonie (Mutter/mother)
 2017: im Wind ertrunken (großer Epilog zu "windwärts")
 2017: windwärts

Chamber music
2003: Trionfale II for trumpet in C, horn in F, trombone, tuba and 2 accordions
2003: Albedo IX for baglama, flute, clarinet, horn and piano
2004: Empty and silent for soprano, violin and guitar
2004: When winter comes for violin and guitar
2004: Odem for C-flute (Picc. Bssfl.), oboe (Engl. horn), clarinet in B (Bsskl.), tuba
2004: Odem II for accordion and piano 
2005: Ein Mund voll Wind for mezzo-soprano, alto recorder, vibraphone (and timpani) and piano text after Wolfgang Hilbig, Geste
2005: Klangetüde III for violin, 4 baglamas and piano
2005: Rechenschaft for alto and oboe, text Wolfgang Hilbig 
2006: Rechenschaft version for soprano and soprano saxophone 
2006: Fragmente for clarinet in B and string trio
2007: Sand for chamber ensemble (fl.cl.sax.vl.va.vc.pn)
2008: Rechenschaft version for soprano and violoncello

Chamber music with electronics
2006: Skeleton for clarinet in B-flat, accordion, double bass and live electronics.
2006: Brecht ab den Sang der Maschinen. Brecht auf! for chamber ensemble (fl.ob.piano.hr.vl.vc.cb.pn.perc.soprano) and CD-playback
2006: Das goldene Kalb for chamber ensemble (fl.ob.kl.tp.trb.vl.va.2vc.kb.2perc.pn.soprano) and CD-performance

Percussion music
2006: Starres Gold – Weiße Stille for percussion quartet
2006: Randspiel for percussion solo and CD-player

Organ music
2004: Ombre per Organo II (... so sind unsere Fröhlichkeiten ...) for organ and CD-playback
2004: Klangbeschreibungen II for organ solo

Choral music 
2004: Die sorgenvollen Gesichter 4–8 voices, mixed choir and solos (S.A.T.B.), text: W.Hilbig
2007: Migration 4–8 voices mixed choir, alto saxophone and electronics, text: Old Testament

Music for stage
2006: Das Goldene Kalb, ballet for chamber ensemble (fl.ob.kl.trp.tb.akk.hf.pn.perc.perc.vl.va.vc.vc.cb.), Sopr. & Electronics –  Libretto Dr. Ulrike Liedtke – premiere 
2007: Neues Schlosstheater der Musikakademie Rheinsberg – ensemble mosaik berlin – direction: Arno Waschk

Radio play music
 1988: Katja Oelmann: Steig der Stadt aufs Dach – Direction:  (Hörspiel – Rundfunk der DDR)

Awards 
 1986: Hanns Eisler Prize by Radio DDR II
 1989: Hans Stieber Prize
 1990: Diplom of the 
 1993: Promotion prize of the Academy of Arts, Berlin and Brandenburg
 1995: Guest of Honour of the Villa Massimo Rome
 1999: Scholarship holder of the Konrad Adenauer Foundation
 2000: Work scholarship of the State of Lower Saxony at the 
 2005: Working scholarship of the Akademie der Künste Berlin at the Villa Serpentara near Rome

Further reading 
 Zapf, Helmut. In Wilfried W. Bruchhäuser: Komponisten der Gegenwart im Deutschen Komponisten-Interessenverband. Ein Handbuch. 4th edition, Deutscher Komponisten-Interessenverband, Berlin 1995, .

References

External links  
 
 
 
 

20th-century German composers
20th-century classical composers
Members of the Academy of Arts, Berlin
1956 births
Living people
Musicians from Thuringia